Tam Hio Wa is the Presidente dos Tribunais de Primeira Instancia, a court within the judiciary of Macau.

References

Macau judges
Living people
Year of birth missing (living people)
Place of birth missing (living people)